Carroll County Airport may refer to:
				
Carroll County Airport (Arkansas) in Berryville, Arkansas, United States (FAA: 4M1)
Carroll County Airport (Tennessee) in Huntingdon, Tennessee, United States (FAA: HZD)
Carroll County Regional Airport in Westminster, Maryland, United States (FAA: DMW)
Carroll County-Tolson Airport in Carrollton, Ohio, United States (FAA: TSO)